Helena Emingerová (1858–1943) was a Czech painter.

Biography 
Emingerová was born on 17 August 1858 in Prague, in what is now the Czech Republic. She studied in Prague at Emil Reynièr's School of Drawing in 1892. She went on to study in Dresden, Germany and then at the Academy of Fine Arts, Munich where her teachers included Maximilian Dasio. In 1891 she went to Paris to study at the Académie Colarossi.

Emingerová first earned a living as a drawing teacher. She went on to support herself by creating portraits (mainly in pastel) of members of the upper class in Austria-Hungary, Bohemia, Germany, Moravia, Poland, and Russia. Emingerová also produced many etchings, as well as some sculptures. Emingerová died on 4 August 1943 in Prague. One of her siblings, Kateřina Emingerová, was noted musician and writer.

Gallery

References

External links
 

1858 births
1943 deaths
Artists from Prague
20th-century Czech women artists
Czech printmakers